Louisiana Football Field is a football stadium based in Orange Walk Town, Orange Walk District, Belize. It is home to Juventus F.C., who compete in the Premier League of Belize. Before 2012, the home stadium of the team was Orange Walk People's Stadium.

References

Football venues in Belize